Lowry–MacLean syndrome is a congenital condition that may be characterized by an ear pit.

See also 
 Limb–mammary syndrome
 List of cutaneous conditions

References 

Cutaneous congenital anomalies
Syndromes affecting the skin